PinkPantheress (born 18 April 2001) is an English singer and record producer. PinkPantheress' songs, which are frequently short in length and include samples of music from the 1990s and 2000s, span a number of genres, including bedroom pop, drum and bass, alt-pop, and 2-step garage. 

In 2021, while attending university in London, she posted several songs to TikTok that went viral, including "Break It Off", and she subsequently signed to Parlophone and Elektra Records. Her singles "Just for Me" and "Pain" from her debut mixtape To Hell with It (2021) peaked in the top 40 of the UK Singles Chart and were certified silver by the British Phonographic Industry (BPI). Her 2023 single "Boy's a Liar" reached number two in the UK and Australia, while its remix with rapper Ice Spice became her first entry on the Billboard Hot 100, peaking in the top five. She won BBC's Sound of 2022 poll and has been nominated for three NME Awards.

Early life
PinkPantheress was born in 2001 to a Kenyan mother, who works as a carer, and a white English father, who works as a statistics professor. She has one older brother, who works as an audio engineer. 

When she was five years old, her family moved from Bath to Kent, where she grew up. Her father moved to the United States to work at a university in Austin, Texas when she was 12 years old, while she and her mother stayed in England. 

She took piano lessons as a child, and, at age 12, sang "Stand by Me" by Ben E. King at a school talent show. When she was 14 years old, she became the lead singer in a rock band, which covered songs by My Chemical Romance, Paramore, and Green Day, and performed with them for the first time at a school fête. She began working at around age 13, taking jobs at Marks & Spencer, Claire's, and the Co-op as a teenager. She studied film at University of the Arts London until 2022, when she dropped out.

Career

PinkPantheress started writing music in high school to help a friend before eventually writing music on her own. At age 17, she began using GarageBand to produce instrumentals for her friend, fellow singer Mazz, and she later used GarageBand to record many of her early songs while lying down in her university hall late at night. She started uploading original songs of hers to SoundCloud, where they received little attention. After a video posted to her personal TikTok account in December 2020 received over 500,000 likes, she posted a snippet of her song "Just a Waste" as PinkPantheress that same month in the hopes of reaching a wider audience; the snippet soon went viral on the platform.

PinkPantheress's song "Pain" went viral on TikTok in January 2021 and peaked at number 35 on the UK Singles Chart in August 2021. Her breakout single "Break It Off" also went viral on TikTok in early 2021. She released her song "Passion" in February 2021, and she was signed to Parlophone in April 2021. She was featured on GoldLink's song "Evian" from his studio album Haram! and signed to Elektra Records in June 2021. Also that month, a visual for her song "Break It Off" was released. After a snippet of her song "Just for Me" gained attention on TikTok, she released it in August 2021, along with a music video co-directed by her released the following month. It was her second top-40 and highest entry on the UK Singles Chart. In early October 2021, she announced the release date and title of her debut mixtape, To Hell with It and released her song "I Must Apologise". To Hell With It was released on 15 October 2021 through Parlophone and Elektra Records, debuting at number 20 on the UK Albums Chart.

PinkPantheress performed live for the first time in October and November 2021 in London. In January 2022, she was announced as the winner of BBC's Sound of 2022 poll. That same month, she released a remix album for To Hell with It. She was nominated for the Brit Award for Song of the Year at the 42nd Brit Awards for "Obsessed With You" by Central Cee, which sampled her song "Just for Me", and gave a virtual performance on Roblox for the Brit Awards. She appeared on the song "Bbycakes" with Mura Masa, Lil Uzi Vert, and Shygirl in February 2022, and released her song "Where You Are" featuring Willow in April 2022.

In April 2022, PinkPantheress went on a European tour in support of To Hell with It. She was featured on "Tinkerbell is Overrated", a song from Beabadoobee's second album, Beatopia, released in July 2022. She performed as an opening act on Halsey's Love and Power Tour throughout the spring of 2022 on the American leg. In June 2022, she cancelled her scheduled appearance at the Primavera Sound festival in Barcelona due to hearing loss, being 80% deaf in her right ear. She released "Picture in my Mind" featuring Sam Gellaitry in August 2022. Details of her debut album were revealed in an interview with Pitchfork, as well as plans to release another single this year, which would be "Do You Miss Me", released in November 2022. On November 30, she released the viral hit "Boy's a Liar", with "Do You Miss Me?" as a B-side. In February 2023, she released "Boy's a Liar Pt. 2" with Ice Spice.

Artistry

Influences
PinkPantheress's stage name was taken from her TikTok account of the same name, which was inspired by a question from the game show The Chase that asked "What is a female panther called?" and by The Pink Panther film series. PinkPantheress has listed My Chemical Romance, Lily Allen, Just Jack, Michael Jackson, Kaytranada, Imogen Heap, Frank Ocean, as inspirations, also citing K-pop songs, Blink-182, Good Charlotte, Green Day, early Panic! at the Disco, Linkin Park, and Frou Frou as inspirations for her melodies and beat choices. She has called Hayley Williams a "big influence" on her as a performer, stating that she first wanted to become a professional musician when she was 14 years old after seeing Williams perform as part of Paramore during Reading Festival. She has also stated that she was inspired by an interview with Doja Cat to pursue music as a career, and was inspired to post her songs on TikTok by Lil Nas X.

Musical style
PinkPantheress's music has been described as pop, bedroom pop, dance, alt-pop, drum and bass, 2-step, jungle, and hyperpop, and often uses samples of other songs, such as dance music from the 1990s and 2000s and jungle, funk, UK garage, and pop songs. PinkPantheress uses topline writing to write her songs, which are frequently self-produced and short in length. She has described her own music as alt-pop and "a form of D'n'B that's acceptable to listen to at home", and has stated that she writes "sadder", "dark" lyrics to "appeal to the youth", often to contrast them with her "happy instrumentals". PinkPantheress has said that her lyrics are usually not based on personal experiences, stating, "A lot of it just comes because I really like storytelling."

NPR's Vanessa Handy called breakbeat loops a "signature of [PinkPantheress's] work", while Kieran Press-Reynolds of Insider also wrote that her songs regularly have "fast-paced breakbeats" and "ASMR-like refrains". Rolling Stones Keegan Brady described PinkPantheress's music as "alt-girl rap" and wrote that she uses "confessional, almost treacly rap-singing" and "dated production technology" in her songs which "tap[s] into a deeply nostalgic sound that conjures the height of Nineties U.K. culture". DIYs Georgia Evans called her "DIY aesthetic that started as GarageBand experimentation" a signature of her music.

The Guardians Michael Cragg described PinkPantheress's vocals as "sweet but unsettling", while Jon Caramanica of The New York Times wrote that she "sounds like she's flirting and aching all at once." Cat Zhang of Pitchfork called PinkPantheress's voice "angelic", "girlish", and "slight" and wrote that she was "one of the rare TikTok artists whose internet fame seems proportional to their potential". Felicity Martin of Dazed called her lyrics "sad" and "wistful". Writing for Nylon, Steffanee Wang called her music "a collage of sounds that fell [sic] simultaneously dated and contemporary", adding that listening to it "feels like being on the internet before social media was a thing". Insiders Kieran Press-Reynolds wrote that PinkPantheress gave uptempo electronic music genres like drum and bass an "introspective, romantic bedroom sound" with her "hushed" vocals.

Discography

Mixtapes

Remix albums

Extended plays

Singles

Promotional singles

Other charted songs

Guest appearances

Music videos

Awards and nominations

Notes

References

External links
 
 

2001 births
Living people
21st-century Black British women singers
Bedroom pop musicians
Alternative R&B musicians
British women record producers
Elektra Records artists
English drum and bass musicians
English women pop singers
English women singer-songwriters
English people of Kenyan descent
English record producers
Musicians from Bath, Somerset
Parlophone artists
Singers from London
UK garage singers